Herbert House is a Grade II* listed is a former orphanage (now apartments) at 312 Kennington Lane, Kennington, Kennington, London SE11.

It was built in 1860–62 by J. L. Pearson as St Peter's Orphanage and Training College for "the daughters of clergy and professionals".

References

Grade II* listed buildings in the London Borough of Lambeth
Orphanages in the United Kingdom
Residential buildings completed in 1862
19th-century architecture in the United Kingdom
1862 establishments in England